WLKY (channel 32) is a television station in Louisville, Kentucky, United States, affiliated with CBS. The station is owned by Hearst Television, and maintains studios on Mellwood Avenue (near I-71) on Louisville's east side; its transmitter is located in rural northeastern Floyd County, Indiana (northeast of Floyds Knobs).

History

As an ABC affiliate
The station, initially operating an ABC affiliate, first signed on the air on September 16, 1961, at 2 p.m. Eastern time with the dedication program entitled Kickoff 32. It originally operated from studio facilities located on Park Drive in the suburb of Shively, and was owned by Kentuckiana Television, a group of local investors headed by aluminum magnate Archibald Cochran. Previously, ABC had been limited to off-hours clearances on NBC affiliate WAVE-TV (channel 3) and then-CBS affiliate WHAS-TV (channel 11). Although Louisville had been large enough since the early 1950s to support three network affiliates, the market had a fairly long wait to gain full-time ABC network service. The Louisville market is a fairly large market geographically, and also includes some rugged terrain. The nearest VHF allocations, channels 7 and 13, had been respectively allocated to Evansville and Bowling Green. These factors caused the first attempt at a full-time ABC affiliate in the area, WKLO-TV, UHF channel 21, to shut down after only six months on the air. With this in mind, prospective owners were skittish about setting up shop on one of the available UHF allocations in the area. But, a growing Louisville market and a stronger-performing ABC, with new programming like American Football League games and more popular prime time shows (e.g. Desilu's The Untouchables), convinced Cochran to take a chance on starting the station. It would eventually benefit from the All-Channel Receiver Act of 1962, which requires television sets manufactured in 1962 or later to receive channels on both the VHF and UHF bands.

Kentuckiana Television sold WLKY to Sonderling Broadcasting (which would acquire several radio and television stations in mid-sized markets such as WAST (now WNYT) in Albany, New York, until that company merged with Viacom in 1979) in 1967. The station moved to its current location on Mellwood Avenue in 1968. In 1973, Sonderling sold the station to Denver-based Combined Communications. Combined eventually merged its television properties with the Gannett Company in 1979.

In February 1979, WLKY was forced off the air for three days when the station's transmission facility was directly hit by lightning strike. The uncertainty of when to return to the air prompted the station to purchase airtime on then-Independent station WDRB (now a Fox affiliate in order to broadcast their local newscasts, as well as the final two episodes of the long-awaited miniseries Roots: The Next Generations through ABC. 

In the spring of 1983, Gannett sold WLKY and WPTA in Fort Wayne, Indiana (the two smallest stations by market size in Gannett's television station portfolio at the time) to Pulitzer Publishing, after it purchased WLVI-TV in Boston (now owned by Sunbeam Television) from Field Communications and WTCN-TV (now KARE) in Minneapolis–Saint Paul from Metromedia. This was because the WLVI-TV and WTCN purchases put Gannett with two stations over the Federal Communications Commission's seven-station ownership limit for television stations that was in effect at the time. Pulitzer kept WLKY but sold WPTA to the Granite Broadcasting Corporation in 1989. From 1977 to 1986, WLKY was branded on-air as "32 Alive." At the time it was implemented, Combined Communications used the "Alive" moniker on four of its stations—WLKY, WPTA, KOCO-TV in Oklahoma City and WXIA-TV in Atlanta. WXIA-TV still uses the "Alive" moniker under Gannett ownership, as did WPTA until 2016, although that station is no longer owned by the former Gannett corporation (now known as Tegna).

Switch to CBS
On September 8, 1990, WLKY swapped network affiliations with WHAS-TV (by then, owned by the Providence Journal Company; it is now owned by Gannett's broadcasting spin-off Tegna Media), with channel 32 taking the CBS affiliation and WHAS becoming the market's ABC affiliate—much to that station's chagrin. This came after ABC (which placed second in the national ratings at the time) became dissatisfied with the lackluster ratings at some of its affiliates (while CBS was at a distant third during the midway point of the network's stewardship under president Laurence Tisch), and ABC wanted a stronger affiliate in the market. WLKY had long been one of ABC's weaker affiliates, while WHAS-TV had been the dominant station in Louisville for almost 20 years at the time.

By this time, however, cable television had gained significant penetration in the Louisville area. Indeed, to this day, cable and satellite are all but essential for acceptable television in much of the Kentuckiana region. Combined with a low universal cable channel number (channel 5 on both Comcast and Spectrum), WLKY's former disadvantage of being a UHF station has almost been completely nullified.

The switch to CBS provided a major windfall for WLKY that winter, as it became Louisville's home for the NCAA men's basketball tournament. Owing to the region's status as a college basketball hotbed and local teams such as Kentucky, Louisville, Indiana and Purdue being longtime fixtures in the tournament, NCAA tournament games on WLKY are consistently among the highest-rated programs in the market during the tournament's run. In 2008, for instance, NCAA games attracted a 21.6 rating and a 36 share, the highest viewership for the tournament broadcasts in the nation.

Sale to Hearst-Argyle
Pulitzer sold its entire broadcasting division, including WLKY, to what was then Hearst-Argyle Television in 1998. Hearst's aggressive marketing helped make the station a factor in the ratings for the first time in memory, and by the dawn of the new millennium, it was waging a spirited battle with WAVE for the second place slot in the market behind long-dominant WHAS-TV.

Time Warner Cable carriage dispute
On July 9, 2012, WLKY's parent company Hearst Television became involved in a carriage dispute with Time Warner Cable after that company's purchase of the market's major cable provider Insight Communications, leading to WLKY's removal from Time Warner Cable and its temporarily replacement by Rochester, New York, CBS affiliate WROC-TV (owned by Nexstar Broadcasting Group); Time Warner chose to replace the station with WROC-TV as it did not have any rights to carry any other CBS affiliate within the region. The substitution of WROC-TV in place of WLKY lasted until July 19, 2012, when a new carriage agreement was reached between Hearst and Time Warner. DirecTV and WLKY started negotiating carriage in December 2016; however, they could not reach a deal before 2017.

Programming
WLKY carries the entire CBS network schedule; however, it is the only CBS affiliate that airs The Young and the Restless on a tape delay, airing at 4:00 p.m., leading into the 5:00 p.m. newscast. (Since February 2022, an exception has existed on days when CBS airs UEFA Champions League matches; in those cases, Y&R airs in the regular 12:30 p.m. slot with the noon newscast cut to 30 minutes.) Fellow CBS affiliate WNCN in Raleigh, North Carolina also ran the soap opera in the 4:00 p.m. timeslot from 2016 to 2022.

News operation
WLKY-TV presently broadcasts 41 hours of locally produced newscasts each week (with 6½ hours on weekdays, four hours on Saturdays and 5½ hours on Sundays); in addition, the station produces the half-hour sports highlight and discussion program Sports Saturday, which airs Saturday nights at 11:35 p.m. WLKY runs an hour-long newscast in the noon timeslot on weekdays, a rarity for both a CBS affiliate and a Hearst-owned station. It is considered a rarity as a CBS affiliate in the fact that CBS' recommended time slot for its daytime shows in the Eastern Time Zone places the aforementioned The Young and the Restless at 12:30 p.m. and The Bold and the Beautiful at 1:30 p.m., thereby making the midday newscast last only a half-hour; some CBS affiliates do produce an hour-long midday newscast, but not without tape-delaying either one of CBS' soap operas. It is also considered a rarity for a Hearst-owned station because WLKY is one of only eight stations owned by Hearst (alongside NBC affiliates KCRA-TV in Sacramento, WXII-TV in Winston-Salem, WESH in Orlando, WVTM-TV in Birmingham and WDSU in New Orleans, and ABC affiliates WISN-TV in Milwaukee and KMBC-TV in Kansas City) that carry a full midday newscast, whereas most Hearst stations either don't carry one at all or carry a half-hour midday newscast and fill the remainder of the hour with either syndicated or paid programming.

For most of its tenure as an ABC affiliate, WLKY was one of that network's weaker stations in terms of local viewership, usually ranking third in the Nielsen ratings. Occasionally, however, it overtook WAVE for second, behind long-dominant WHAS-TV. However, since the affiliation switch to CBS and rise of cable and satellite penetration in the Kentuckiana region, WLKY has been far more successful in the ratings. Even with the affiliate "downgrade" from VHF to UHF, CBS' network ratings in the Louisville market during the early to mid 1990s remained strong at a time when its viewership in many other markets stagnated or declined, with WLKY leading in the recent May 2011 sweeps from sign-on to sign-off, including newscasts. The station has long since left its ratings-challenged past behind; for the better part of the last decade it has been one of the strongest CBS affiliates in the nation. Louisville has been one of the few Nielsen markets where all four major-network affiliates have relatively strong ratings and news operations. In the recent February 2013 sweeps period, WLKY and Fox affiliate WDRB (channel 41) began distancing themselves from WHAS and WAVE in total-day ratings, largely due to their higher-rated syndicated and local programming lead-ins to their newscasts.

In 2008, WLKY changed its branding from WLKY NewsChannel 32 to WLKY News. The station's news helicopter "NewsChopper 32" was also renamed as the "WLKY NewsChopper", and a new graphics package also made its debut. In February 2010, WLKY became the third station in the Louisville market to begin broadcasting its local newscasts in a widescreen format—and the second to air them in upconverted 16:9 standard definition rather than true high definition (as of August 1, 2019, WLKY is one of three remaining Hearst Television stations to actively air local newscasts in 16:9 widescreen SD, along with Albuquerque ABC affiliate KOAT and New Orleans NBC affiliate WDSU; Burlington's WPTZ, also a Hearst-owned NBC affiliate, had also broadcast local newscasts in 16:9 widescreen SD until it launched HD newscasts in late July 2019).

In February 2012, WLKY debuted a two-hour extension of its weekday morning newscast, airing from 7:00 to 9:00 a.m., on its MeTV affiliated second digital subchannel. It competes with the longer-established in-house morning newscast in that timeslot on WDRB. On September 17 of that year, WLKY launched a half-hour 10:00 p.m. newscast on that same subchannel to compete with WDRB's hour-long prime time newscast (which debuted in 1990) and what was then a WHAS-TV-produced half-hour newscast on CW affiliate WBKI-TV (channel 34) in that slot (the WHAS-TV newscast on WBKI-TV officially ended its run on October 26, 2012; thereafter, syndicated programming replaced the 10:00 p.m. newscast). WLKY also truncated its morning news program on the MeTV subchannel to one hour, 7-8 a.m., on that date.

Notable former on-air staff
 Michael Gargiulo – reporter (now morning anchor for WNBC/New York City)
 Mark Giangreco – sports anchor (was most recently at WLS-TV/Chicago until he was terminated in 2021)
 Dan Lewis – anchor (former evening anchor for KOMO-TV/Seattle)
 Tom Mintier – reporter (later at CNN; died in 2016)
 Diane Sawyer – reporter and weather anchor (1967–1970; former anchor of World News)
 Charlie Van Dyke – announcer (1986–1990; did voice-overs for rival WAVE)

Technical information

Subchannels
The station's digital signal is multiplexed:

On September 1, 2011, WLKY began carrying the Weigel Broadcasting-owned classic television network MeTV on digital subchannel 32.2, which is also available on Spectrum 188. 32.2 carries CBS programming in case of breaking news or severe weather coverage and special local programming on 32.1. In May 2021, Shop LC was added as part of a bulk group deal with Hearst, though as the network already pays for lifeline cable and satellite carriage, its carriage on WLKY is mainly for the benefit of over-the-air viewers.

Analog-to-digital conversion
WLKY discontinued regular programming on its analog signal, over UHF channel 32, on June 12, 2009, the official date in which full-power television stations in the United States transitioned from analog to digital broadcasts under federal mandate. The station's digital signal remained on its pre-transition UHF channel 26. Through the use of PSIP, digital television receivers display the station's virtual channel as its former UHF analog channel 32.

As part of the SAFER Act, WLKY kept its analog signal on the air until July 12 to inform viewers of the digital television transition through a loop of public service announcements from the National Association of Broadcasters.

Out-of-market coverage

Frankfort
WLKY-TV is available in Kentucky's state capital city of Frankfort (part of the Lexington media market) via Windjammer Communications as well as the Frankfort Plant Board's cable system. The Frankfort area can also pick up WLKY and other Louisville stations along with the Lexington stations with an antenna.

Southern Kentucky
From 1990 until 2007, WLKY (and before the affiliation switch, WHAS-TV), along with WTVF in Nashville, Tennessee, were the de facto CBS affiliates for the small Bowling Green market, as that area did not have a CBS affiliate of its own. Most cable systems in the Bowling Green market carried WLKY on its lineup along with WTVF. On February 1, 2007, locally-based NBC affiliate WNKY signed on a second digital subchannel, WNKY-DT2, to serve as Bowling Green's first-ever CBS affiliate. As a result of WNKY-DT2's CBS affiliation, WLKY was dropped from cable systems in the immediate Bowling Green area, but remains available on Mediacom's systems in Hart and Metcalfe counties, while Mediacom's customers in Butler and Edmonson counties has long been served with Nashville's WTVF. Both WLKY and WTVF (as well as their associated digital subchannels) remain available in Glasgow (Barren County) via the cable system of the South Central Rural Telephone Cooperative. In 2016, the Glasgow Electric Plant Board dropped WLKY in favor of WNKY-DT2, with WTVF remaining intact.

Northwest Kentucky
In the Evansville, Indiana, market, Crystal Broadband Networks carries WLKY on CBN channel 2 on its lineup for the system's customers in Hancock County, Kentucky, including the towns of Hawesville and Lewisport.

References

External links
 

LKY
CBS network affiliates
MeTV affiliates
Story Television affiliates
TheGrio affiliates
Television channels and stations established in 1961
Hearst Television
1961 establishments in Kentucky